Paulo Cafôfo is a Portuguese teacher and politician who currently serves as Secretary of State for the Portuguese Communities, in charge of the affairs related to the Portuguese diaspora, in António Costa's 23rd Constitutional Government. He had previously been a member of the Legislative Assembly of the Autonomous Region of Madeira for the Socialist Party, and was Mayor of Funchal, Madeira Island, from 2013 to 2019.

He graduated from the University of Coimbra with a degree in History, later becoming a History teacher in Madeira. Having no party affiliation, he was elected Mayor of Funchal in the 2013 local elections, leading a large coalition formed by the Socialist Party, Left Bloc, New Democracy Party, Earth Party, Portuguese Labour Party and the Party for Animals and Nature, defeating for the first time the long-ruling Social Democratic Party in this municipality.

He was elected member of the legislative body of Madeira in 2019.

References

Living people
Members of the Legislative Assembly of Madeira
University of Coimbra alumni
People from Funchal
1971 births
Mayors of places in Portugal